The 2015 Syracuse Orange men's soccer team represented Syracuse University during the 2015 NCAA Division I men's soccer season. It was the program's 92nd season. The Orange reached the College Cup for the first time in program history, where they lost on penalties to eventual national runner-up Clemson, Clemson.

Roster

Squad 

This was the Syracuse roster for the 2015 season.

Coaching staff

Schedule 

|-
!colspan=6 style="background:#FF6F00; color:#212B6D;"| Exhibitions
|-

|-
!colspan=6 style="background:#FF6F00; color:#212B6D;"| Regular season
|-

|-
!colspan=6 style="background:#FF6F00; color:#212B6D;"| ACC Tournament
|-
!colspan=6 style="background:#FF6F00; color:#212B6D;"| NCAA Tournament
|-

References 

Syracuse
Syracuse Orange men's soccer seasons
Syracuse men's soccer
NCAA Division I Men's Soccer Tournament College Cup seasons
2015